The 1938 New Hampshire Wildcats football team was an American football team that represented the University of New Hampshire as a member of the New England Conference during the 1938 college football season. In its second year under head coach George Sauer, the team compiled a 3–6 record, being outscored by their opponents 112–42. Each of the team's six losses was by shutout, including all four home games. The team played its home games at Lewis Field (also known as Lewis Stadium) in Durham, New Hampshire.

Schedule

Lowell Textile's win over New Hampshire snapped a 22-game losing streak the Millmen were on, dating back to October 1935. In 16 contests between New Hampshire and Lowell Textile, played during 1912–1941, the 1938 game was the only Wildcat loss.

Team captain Paul Horne set two Wildcat records in the Saint Anselm game, which still stand; most punts in a game (17) and most punting yardage in a game (527).

Notes

References

New Hampshire
New Hampshire Wildcats football seasons
New Hampshire Wildcats football